Letters from Chutney is the debut album recorded by the Canadian rock band Rainbow Butt Monkeys, now known as Finger Eleven. It features a different sound than Finger Eleven's subsequent albums, with funk and grunge influences. The album is currently out of print, though available for special order. The album produced three singles, all of which had videos released. The name of the album comes from a dog with a missing eye that the band found on the side of the road. They gave it the name Chutney.

Track listing

All songs by Rainbow Butt Monkeys.

Personnel
Adapted from the liner notes of Letters from Chutney.

Rainbow Butt Monkeys
 Scott Anderson – vocals
 James Black – guitar, vocals
 Rick Jackett – guitar
 Sean Anderson – bass
 Rob Gommerman – drums

Production
 John Punter – engineering, mixing
 Atilla Turi – engineering
 L. Stu Young – engineering
 Sean McKim – engineering, assistant engineer
 Andre Plante – engineering, assistant engineer
 Kurtys Kidd – assistant engineer
 David Tedesco – assistant engineer
 Bill Kipper – mastering

Artwork
 Cy Anderson – cover
 Andrew MacNaughtan – band photography

References

1995 debut albums
Finger Eleven albums
Mercury Records albums
Funk metal albums
Grunge albums
Albums recorded at Metalworks Studios